Vinod Gupta is an American businessman

Vinod Gupta may also refer to:

 Vinod Gupta (cricketer); an Indian cricketer.
 Vinod Kumar Gupta; former Chief Justice of Uttarakhand High Court.